Gulab Devi is an Indian politician and a member of 18th Legislative Assembly, Uttar Pradesh of India. She represents the ‘Chandausi’ constituency in Sambhal district of Uttar Pradesh. She is the current Minister of State (Independent charge) of Secondary Education in the Uttar Pradesh Government. She was appointed lecturer in political science and later became principal in Bhartiya municipal girls inter college Chandausi district Sambhal.

Political career
Gulab Devi contested Uttar Pradesh Assembly Election as Bharatiya Janata Party candidate and defeated her close contestant Vimlesh Kumari from Indian National Congress by a margin of 45,469 votes. She was state vice president of Bhartiya Janta Party from 2008 to 2012. She spent four separate terms as Member of legislative Assembly of Chandausi Uttar Pradesh. She was the Minister of state (women welfare, child development and pustahar) in Uttar Pradesh government from 2017 to 2022 Bharatiya Janata Party.

Posts held

References

Bharatiya Janata Party politicians from Uttar Pradesh
Yogi ministry
Uttar Pradesh MLAs 2017–2022
People from Chandausi
Living people
1955 births
Women in Uttar Pradesh politics
Uttar Pradesh MLAs 2022–2027
21st-century Indian women politicians